The Drifter is a 1988 thriller movie starring Kim Delaney, Timothy Bottoms, Al Shannon, Miles O'Keeffe and Anna Garduno. The film is about a successful single woman who picks up a mysterious hitchhiker on a deserted road.

The film was directed and written by Larry Brand.

Plot
Julia Robbins (Kim Delaney) is an emerging fashion designer returning home to Los Angeles after a sales trip in northern California. She passes a hitchhiker named Trey (Miles O'Keeffe) on her way back to the 5. During lunch at a diner, she notices a mysterious man eating by himself. The hitchhiker enters the diner, and they make eye contact. Outside, he asks her for a ride, but Julia declines. As she drives off, she notices a flat tire. Trey fixes it for her, and she decides to give him a ride.

At a motel that night, she offers him a ride into L.A. in the morning. He asks to sleep in her car. Instead, she ushers him into her room, and they have sex. At Oki Dog in West Hollywood, Julia drops the drifter off, and indicates that she wants to leave things at a one-night stand. At her apartment, her boyfriend Arthur (Timothy Bottoms) is waiting for her.

Julia is guilt-ridden over the affair, confessing what happened to her friend Matty (Anna Garduno). Eventually, Trey calls Julia at home and asks to see her. She declines, but he calls her again at work. Unnerved at how he has been able to track her down, Julia agrees to meet him back at Oki Dog, where he insists that they must be together. Julia reaffirms her wish to be left alone, but Trey shows up at her office in another attempt to win her back. Finally, when she notices a knife in one of her car tires, she goes to the police for help.

She meets with Detective Morrison (Larry Brand), and explains how Trey will not leave her alone. Meanwhile, Arthur meets with a private investigator, who turns out to be the mysterious man from the diner. He has been trailing Julia, and he breaks the news of her affair to Arthur. The detective makes some cryptic remarks to Arthur about killing women.

Later, at Julia's apartment, she discovers Matty dead in her bed. She goes to Morrison again, begging for help. Arthur collects her from the police station and takes her to his house. In the climax to the film, Julia finds Arthur dead in his study from a gunshot to the head. The mysterious detective emerges from hiding and attacks her, binding her hands. He eventually explains that he was snooping on Julia at her apartment when Matty showed up, and he had to kill her to cover his tracks. Arthur was not comfortable with the murder, and the detective killed Arthur to prevent him from going to the police. Intent on killing Julia to complete his cover up, they are surprised by Trey. The detective shoots Trey but does not kill him. Trey eventually wakes up and subdues the detective. Morrison arrives at the house and kicks in the front door, with his gun drawn. Thinking that he will shoot Trey, Julia cries out to stop him. A shot rings out, but Morrison has killed the detective, who had drawn a hidden pistol and was about to kill Julia.

The film ends with a shot of Julia and Trey together on a beach with her cat at their feet.

Production notes
The cook in the diner at the beginning of the film is played by Bruce Vilanch. The script perpetually refers to 'The War'. At one point, Julia asks Trey if he served in 'the War'. In Morrison's office, there is a portrait of Richard Nixon. Even in the late 1980s, Vietnam was a powerful theme for Brand, who cast himself as Morrison. One of the central characters in Backfire, which he co-wrote in 1987 is also a Vietnam veteran.

There are several editing errors in The Drifter. Most notably, during the final confrontation between Julia and the detective, a boom mike is visible at the top of the shot.

(The boom mike is visible in that shot because on the VHS, where the film's original 1.85:1 aspect ratio is compromised and cropped to a TV ratio of 1.33:1, the viewer sees more vertical information than the director intended.)

External links
 
 
 

1988 films
American thriller films
1980s crime thriller films
1980s English-language films
1980s American films